Tenmile Lake is a lake in Otter Tail County, in the U.S. state of Minnesota.

See also
List of lakes in Minnesota

References

Lakes of Otter Tail County, Minnesota
Lakes of Minnesota